The București – Ilfov development region is a development region in Romania, encompassing the national capital, Bucharest, as well as the surrounding Ilfov County. As other development regions, it does not have any administrative powers, its main function being to co-ordinate regional development projects and manage funds from the European Union. It is also used as an entity in regional statistical analysis at the European Union NUTS-II level.

See also
Development regions of Romania
Nomenclature of Territorial Units for Statistics

References

Development regions of Romania